T-ara N4 was the first official sub-group of South Korean girl group T-ara, composed of Eunjung, Hyomin, Jiyeon and previously Areum until her departure from the main group in July 2013. The sub-group only released one extended play, Jeon Won Diary in April 2013.

History

Formation
In late March 2013, T-ara's agency Core Contents Media were in the midst of forming a new unit from the group with the members Eunjung, Areum, Jiyeon and Hyomin. The unit's name, T-ara N4 (which stands for "T-ara Brand New 4") was revealed April 12, 2013. T-ara previously tried sub-units with the promotions of their sixth Japanese single "Bunny Style!", in which the B-sides were sung by units of two and three members; however this will be their first time doing formal unit activities.

2013: Debut 
T-ara N4's debut single, "Jeon Won Diary" (전원일기; Jeon-won Ilgi), was inspired by the 1980s South Korean drama of the same name. Produced by Duble Sidekick, the song is said to have "funky and intense" dance music combined with elements of hip-hop, with the main motif of "Jeon Won Diary" about breaking away from the same everyday routine.

On July 10, 2013, Areum left the group to pursue her solo career.
Core Contents Media announced Areum was replaced by Dani in T-ara N4. Dani was originally revealed as the eighth member of T-ara in 2012 but never debuted with the group. Following Areum departure under T-ara and T-ara N4, Dani briefly only introduced as a member of T-ara N4 since then. As of October 2014, their agency initiated Dani to not be part of T-ara N4 and Dani continued her training under the agency.

Discography

Extended plays
Jeon Won Diary (2013)

Singles charts

Awards & Nominations

References 

 
MBK Entertainment artists
Musical groups established in 2013
South Korean dance music groups
South Korean girl groups
2013 establishments in South Korea
Musical groups from Seoul